North Star School District No. 11, also known as the North Star History Center, is a historic one-room school building located at Hamlin, Monroe County, New York. It was built in 1844, and is a one-story, Greek Revival style brick building. It rests on a Medina sandstone foundation and has a front gable roof with a prominent cornice and topped by a bell tower.  It has a front porch added in 1912 and rear frame additions added about 1952. Also on the property are two contributing wooden privies and a coal house (c. 1880).  The school closed in 1952, and subsequently used as a community center and local history museum since 1987.

It was listed on the National Register of Historic Places in 2014.

References

External links
 Hamlin's North Star History Center (archived)

One-room schoolhouses in New York (state)
Schoolhouses in the United States
History museums in New York (state)
School buildings on the National Register of Historic Places in New York (state)
Greek Revival architecture in New York (state)
School buildings completed in 1844
Museums in Monroe County, New York
National Register of Historic Places in Monroe County, New York